The Waigaoqiao Power Station is a coal-fired power station in Pudong, Shanghai, China. With an installed capacity of 5,000 MW, it is the 7th largest coal-fired power station in the world. (It shares this title with the Guodian Beilun, Guohua Taishan, and Jiaxing power stations). It is owned by China Power Investment, a local power company.

Transportation
The power station is accessible within walking distance north east of North Waigaoqiao Free Trade Zone Station of Shanghai Metro.

See also 

 List of coal power stations
 List of largest power stations in the world
 List of power stations in China

References 

Coal-fired power stations in China
Buildings and structures in Shanghai